This is a list of monuments that are classified by the Moroccan ministry of culture around Asilah.

Monuments and sites in Asilah 

|}

References 

Asilah
Tanger-Tetouan-Al Hoceima